Club Deportivo Victoria is a Spanish football team based in Tazacorte, in the autonomous community of Canary Islands. Founded in 1954, it plays in Preferente de Tenerife, holding home games at Estadio Municipal de Tazacorte, with a capacity of 5,000 seats.

Season to season

14 seasons in Tercera División

Famous players
 Aziz

External links
Preferente de Tenerife 

Football clubs in the Canary Islands
Sport in La Palma
Association football clubs established in 1954
Divisiones Regionales de Fútbol clubs
1954 establishments in Spain